A. Q. M. Zainul Abedin (died 7 November 2015) was a Bangladeshi journalist. He was the founder, publisher and editor of The Daily Shakti and Dainik Kishan. He founded the Bangladesh Council of Editors (BCE), and served as President of the Bangladesh Editor's Council.

Career
Abedin was the General Secretary of Bangladesh Editors' Council in 1989. On 29 June 1989, he was detained for one night by the Bangladesh Police on a defamation case. His arrest was protested by prominent Bangladeshi journalists. He served as the president of Bangladesh Council of Editors from 1990 to 2007.

Death
Abedin died on 7 November 2015 in Midway Hospital, Dhaka, Bangladesh. He was buried in Arpara village, Gopalganj District at his family graveyard.

References

2015 deaths
People from Faridpur District
Bangladeshi journalists